Lockspeiser is a surname. Notable people with the surname include: 

Ben Lockspeiser (1891–1990), British scientific administrator
Edward Lockspeiser (1905–1973), English musicologist, composer, art critic, and radio broadcaster